Willi Köchling (30 October 1924 – 29 January 2009) was a German international footballer who played as a defender for VfL Schwerte, TuS Iserlohn and Rot-Weiss Essen.

Honours
Rot-Weiss Essen
 DFB-Pokal: 1953
 German football championship: 1955

References

External links
 
 Willi Köchling gestorben 

1924 births
2009 deaths
People from Schwerte
Sportspeople from Arnsberg (region)
Association football defenders
German footballers
Germany international footballers
Rot-Weiss Essen players
Footballers from North Rhine-Westphalia
West German footballers